That Little Band of Gold is a 1915 American short comedy film directed by Roscoe "Fatty" Arbuckle and starring Arbuckle, Mabel Normand, and Ford Sterling.

Plot
As described in a film magazine, Hubby decides to steal a night off away from the domestic joys of home, wife, and mother-in-law, and plans a pleasant little supper with an interesting lady friend at a notable cafe. His enthusiasm is a trifle dashed when he sees a friend at a nearby table, and his plans are scattered entirely to the winds at the horrified entrance of an indignant mother-in-law and his neglected wife.

Cast

See also
 Fatty Arbuckle filmography

References

External links

 
 
 
 

1915 films
1915 comedy films
1915 short films
Silent American comedy films
American silent short films
American black-and-white films
Films directed by Roscoe Arbuckle
American comedy short films
1910s American films